Whiteochloa is a genus of plants in the grass family.

The genus is native to Australia, New Guinea, and Indonesia. It is named for Australian botanist Cyril Tenison White, 1890–1950.

Species
 Whiteochloa airoides (R.Br.) Lazarides - Northern Territory, QLD, Western Australia
 Whiteochloa biciliata Lazarides - Western Australia
 Whiteochloa capillipes (Benth.) Lazarides - New Guinea, Lesser Sunda Islands, Maluku, Northern Territory, QLD, Western Australia
 Whiteochloa cymbiformis (Hughes) B.K.Simon - Northern Territory, QLD, Western Australia, New South Wales
 Whiteochloa multiciliata Lazarides - Northern Territory, 
 Whiteochloa semitonsa (F.Muell. ex Benth.) C.E.Hubb. - Northern Territory, QLD

References

Panicoideae
Poaceae genera
Taxa named by Charles Edward Hubbard